Daryl Jacob is an Irish National Hunt jockey who rode for trainer Paul Nicholls as second jockey to Ruby Walsh. When Walsh left the Nicholas yard Jacob took over as principal rider. He won at the Cheltenham festival for the first time in 2011 on Zarkandar in the Triumph Hurdle. His second Cheltenham Festival win was in 2014 on Lac Fontana in the Vincent O Brien County Handicap Hurdle on the last day of the festival. However, before the start of the next race he suffered a broken leg, knee and elbow after Port Melon crashed into the rail.

Jacob won the 2012 Grand National on the grey Neptune Collonges. The pairing beat second-place Sunnyhillboy in a photo finish and the closest ever finish to a Grand National.

Cheltenham Festival winners (3) 
 Triumph Hurdle     -(1) Zarkandar (2011)
 County Handicap Hurdle - (1) Lac Fontana (2014)
 Dawn Run Mares' Novices' Hurdle - (1) Concertista (2020)

Major wins
 Ireland
 Irish Gold Cup     -(1) The Listener (2008)
 Arkle Novice Chase - (1) El Fabiolo (2023)
 Ryanair Novice Chase     -(1) Footpad (2018)
 Champion Four Year Old Hurdle     -(1) Fusil Raffles (2019)
 JNwine.com Champion Chase     -(1) Kauto Stone (2012)
 Savills Chase     -(1) The Listener (2006)
Paddy's Reward Club Chase - (1) Blue Lord (2022)

 Great Britain
 Betfair Chase     -(3) Bristol De Mai (2017, 2018, 2020)
 Aintree Hurdle     -(1) L'Ami Serge (2018)
 Top Novices' Hurdle     -(1) Topolski (2011)
 Henry VIII Novices' Chase     -(2) Hinterland (2013), Sceau Royal (2017)
 Long Walk Hurdle     -(1) Reve De Sivola  (2014)
 Finale Juvenile Hurdle     -(3) Me Voici (2009),  Bristol De Mai  (2014), We Have A Dream (2017)
 Challow Novices' Hurdle     -(2) Reve De Sivola  (2010), Messire Des Obeaux (2017)
 Scilly Isles Novices' Chase     -(4) Gitane Du Berlais (2015), Bristol De Mai (2016), Top Notch (2017), Terrefort (2018)
 Anniversary 4-Y-O Novices' Hurdle     -(1) We Have A Dream (2018)
 Mildmay Novices' Chase     -(1) Terrefort (2018)
 Celebration Chase     -(1) Sanctuaire (2012)

 France
 Grande Course de Haies d'Auteuil   -(1) L'Ami Serge (2017)

See also
List of jockeys
List of Grand National winners

References

Living people
Irish jockeys
1983 births
Sportspeople from County Wexford